The top 10 all-time single season goal scorers in Manitoba Junior Hockey League history, as of the 2016–17 MJHL season.

See also
MJHL Top Goal Scorers

References

External links
Manitoba Junior Hockey League

 
Manitoba Junior Hockey League players|Goal